Pack up the Plantation Live! is a concert film featuring Tom Petty and the Heartbreakers.  It was filmed at two concerts at the Wiltern Theatre in Los Angeles, California on August 6 & 7, 1985 during their Southern Accents Tour. It has yet to be released on DVD.

Songs performed
"American Girl"
"You Got Lucky"
"It Ain't Nothin' To Me"
"Don't Do Me Like That"
"The Waiting"
"I Need to Know"
"Don't Come Around Here No More"
"Spike"
"Southern Accents"
"Rebels"
"Breakdown"
"Refugee"
"Little Bit O' Soul"
"So You Want to Be a Rock 'n' Roll Star"
"Make It Better (Forget About Me)"
"Route 66"

Personnel

The Heartbreakers
Tom Petty – 6 & 12-string electric & acoustic guitars, lead vocals
Mike Campbell – lead guitar, 12-string, lap steel & slide guitars
Howie Epstein – bass, mandolin & harmony vocals
Benmont Tench – keyboards & vocals
Stan Lynch – drums & vocals

Soul Lips Horns
Jimmy Zavala – saxes, harmonica
 Lee Thornburg – trumpets, flugel horn
 Nick Lane – trombones, euphonium

The Rebeletts
 Pat Peterson – backing vocals, percussion
 Caroll Sue Hill – backing vocals, percussion

Concert films
1986 films
Tom Petty
1980s English-language films